An airhead is a military term for the endpoint of an airborne assault

Airhead may also refer to:
 Airhead (slang), a common derogatory term for a foolish or ignorant person

Arts and media

Music
 Airhead (band), a British indie-pop group active in the early 1990s, best known for their minor UK hit "Funny How"
 "Airhead", a song by Thomas Dolby from his 1988 album Aliens Ate My Buick
 "Airhead", a song by Millencolin from their 1995 album Life on a Plate
 "Airhead", a song by Seaway from their 2015 album Colour Blind
 "Airheads", a song by Queen Drummer Roger Taylor from his 1981 solo album Fun in Space

Other media
 Airhead (novel), a 2008 novel by Meg Cabot
 Airheads, a 1994 comedy movie

Other uses
 Airhead (motorcycle), a line of motorcycles featuring the air-cooled flat twin Type 247 engine, built by BMW since 1923
 AirHeads (candy), a popular candy manufactured by Perfetti Van Melle